Omar Andrés Pinzón García (born June 17, 1989) is a competitive swimmer who represented Colombia at the 2004 Olympics in Athens, Greece and 2008 Olympics in Beijing, China.  Pinzón attended college in the United States, where he swam for the University of Florida.

At the 2004 Summer Olympics in Athens, Pinzón finished in thirty-fifth place in the men's 200-meter backstroke.  Pinzón competed at the 2008 Summer Olympics in Beijing in the 100 and 200-meter backstroke, the 200 and 400-meter individual medley, and the 200-meter butterfly. His best 2008 Olympic performance was in the 200-meter backstroke, where he placed seventeenth with a time of 1:59.11.

Pinzón was born in Bogotá, Distrito Capital, Colombia.  He attended the Bolles School in Jacksonville, Florida, and graduated from Gimnasio Britanico high school in Chía in 2005.  Pinzón received an athletic scholarship to attend the University of Florida in Gainesville, Florida, where he swam for coach Gregg Troy's Florida Gators swimming and diving team in National Collegiate Athletic Association (NCAA) competition from 2006 to 2010.  In his four-year Gator swimming career, Pinzón received twelve All-American honors.

Pinzón won his first gold medal at a Swimming World Cup in Singapore in 2011 in the 200-meter backstroke.  Pinzón then won gold medals in Shanghai and Tokyo in the 200-meter backstroke.

Pinzón tested positive for cocaine in November 2012 and was subsequently banned from competing for two years. In 2014, however, after an appeal to the Court of Arbitration for Sport, the suspension was overturned due to several inconsistencies in the testing process. He returned to the competition in 2014 to represent his country at the Central American and Caribbean Games.

See also 

 Florida Gators
 List of University of Florida alumni
 List of University of Florida Olympians

References 

1989 births
Living people
Florida Gators men's swimmers
Male backstroke swimmers
Male butterfly swimmers
Male medley swimmers
Olympic swimmers of Colombia
Sportspeople from Bogotá
Swimmers at the 2004 Summer Olympics
Swimmers at the 2008 Summer Olympics
Swimmers at the 2011 Pan American Games
Swimmers at the 2012 Summer Olympics
Swimmers at the 2016 Summer Olympics
Colombian sportspeople in doping cases
Swimmers at the 2015 Pan American Games
Pan American Games silver medalists for Colombia
Pan American Games medalists in swimming
Central American and Caribbean Games gold medalists for Colombia
Central American and Caribbean Games silver medalists for Colombia
Central American and Caribbean Games bronze medalists for Colombia
Competitors at the 2006 Central American and Caribbean Games
Competitors at the 2010 Central American and Caribbean Games
Competitors at the 2014 Central American and Caribbean Games
South American Games gold medalists for Colombia
South American Games silver medalists for Colombia
South American Games bronze medalists for Colombia
South American Games medalists in swimming
Competitors at the 2018 South American Games
Competitors at the 2022 South American Games
Swimmers at the 2019 Pan American Games
Central American and Caribbean Games medalists in swimming
Medalists at the 2011 Pan American Games
20th-century Colombian people
21st-century Colombian people